Bas Kast (born 1973 in Landau, residence in Rottendorf) is a German science writer. He studied psychology and biology at the University of Konstanz and at the Massachusetts Institute of Technology. Working as a freelancer first for the German weekly newspaper Die Zeit and other magazines, he later became an editor and reporter for the Berlin-based newspaper Der Tagesspiegel. His articles have earned him a number of national and international prizes. Kast has written several popular science books, some of which became best selling books that have been translated in numerous languages.

Articles (English)
 "Decisions, decisions...", Nature, 2001 May 10;411(6834):126-8.
 "The best supporting actors", Nature, 2001 Aug 16;412(6848):674-6.

Awards
 Axel-Springer-Preis 2002 for the article "What is Empathy?"
 European Science Writers Award 2006
 freshwater snail Tylomelania baskasti is named in honor of Bas Kast

Books
 Revolution im Kopf (2003)
 Die Liebe und wie sich Leidenschaft erklärt (2004)
 Wie der Bauch dem Kopf beim Denken hilft (2007)
 Lauras Schweigen (2011) [Novel published using the alias Niels Nefarius]
 Ich weiß nicht, was ich wollen soll (2012)
 Und plötzlich macht es KLICK! (2015)
 Der Ernährungskompass. Das Fazit aller wissenschaftlichen Studien zum Thema Ernährung. (2018)
 Der Ernährungskompass – Das Kochbuch. (2019)
 Das Buch eines Sommers. Werde, wer du bist. (2020)

References

Alumni of the European Schools
Studienstiftung alumni
German journalists
German male journalists
German newspaper editors
German newspaper journalists
Magazine writers
1973 births
Living people
German science writers
German male writers
Der Tagesspiegel people
Die Zeit people
People from Landau